is an airport serving the Kerama Islands in Shimajiri District, Okinawa Prefecture, Japan. The airport is linked by a road bridge to the islands of Geruma and Aka.

The prefecture operates the airport, which is classified as a third class airport. Kerama gained commercial flights on an on and off basis in 1984. In 2006 Ryukyu Air Commuter suspended flights.

References

External links
 Kerama Airport
   

Airports in Okinawa